LeRoy Smith (born August 4, 1933) is a former American football coach.  Coaching in four decades, his lifetime record was 106–77–7.

Coaching career

Mississippi Valley State
Smith's first head coaching position was at Mississippi Valley State University in Itta Bena, Mississippi, where he coached the 1958 season.  He was the third head coach for the Delta Devils and produced a record of 2–5–1.

Tuskegee
Smith waited six years to become a head coach again.  He was named the tenth head football coach at Tuskegee University in Tuskegee, Alabama, and he held that position for six seasons, from 1964 until 1969. His coaching record at Tuskegee was 42–13–3.

Kentucky State
After his success at Tuskegee, Smith was the 16th head football coach at Kentucky State University in Frankfort, Kentucky, and he held that position for 12 seasons, from 1970 until 1981.  His coaching record at Kentucky State was 62–59–3.  The school's media guide lists a slightly different result, having him coach for 12½ seasons, from 1970 to midway through the 1982 season, with a record at Kentucky State of 65–62–3.

References

1937 births
Living people
Jackson State Tigers football players
Kentucky State Thorobreds football coaches
Mississippi Valley State Delta Devils football coaches
Tuskegee Golden Tigers football coaches
African-American coaches of American football
African-American players of American football
20th-century African-American sportspeople
21st-century African-American sportspeople